Kim Ga-eun (born January 8, 1989) is a South Korean actress.

Filmography

Television series

Web series

Film

Awards and nominations

References

External links
 
 

1989 births
Living people
South Korean television actresses
South Korean film actresses
South Korean web series actresses
People from Seoul